The Chevy Mystery Show, aka Sunday Mystery Hour, is an American television anthology series featuring a different mystery each week. It was produced by the National Broadcasting Company (NBC) and Dinah Shore's production company {Sewanee}.

The program was broadcast on NBC from May 1960 to September 1960 as a summer replacement for The Dinah Shore Chevy Show with Walter Slezak as host, except for the last three episodes, which had Vincent Price as host. The episodes with Slezak as host were re-run with the title Sunday Mystery Hour from July 1961 to September 1961 (sustained by various "participating" advertisers).

There were a total of 18 episodes.  Featured actors included Robert Culp, Dane Clark, Agnes Moorehead, Richard Carlson, Janet Blair, and James Whitmore.

Episodes

References

External links

The Chevy Mystery Show at CVTA with list of episodes

\

1960s American anthology television series
1960s American mystery television series
1960 American television series debuts
1960 American television series endings
Chevrolet
NBC original programming